Ali Akbar Yousefi  is an Iranian football midfielder who played for Iran in the 1992 Asian Cup. He also played for PAS Tehran F.C. and Saipa F.C.

References
Team Melli.com Profile

External links

1969 births
Living people
Iranian footballers
Pas players
bahman players
Saipa F.C. players
Azadegan League players
Persian Gulf Pro League players
Iranian men's futsal players
1996 AFC Asian Cup players
Iran international footballers
Association football midfielders